Murdock Township is a township in Butler County, Kansas, USA.  As of the 2000 census, its population was 378.

History
Murdock Township was named for Thomas Benton Murdock, a native of Virginia who settled in Butler County.  Anthony G. Davis is reported to be the first settler in Murdock Township, arriving in 1857.

Other early settlers through 1870 included Mr. Gillian, the Atkinson brothers, the Kelleys, Jim Folk, Ruben Moore, Edwin Hall, David Adams, Leander Baker, William Paul, Leonard Shafer,  Mr. Blankenship, John Miller, Henry Dohren, Charles Mornhinweg, Thomas Ohlsen, Dave Kehl, Albert and Chancy Diemart, Robert Taylor, Joseph (Josephus) Claypool, Henry Terbush, the Goodales, A. L. Drake, Isaac Curtin, Jim Shibles, Bill Spencer, Barney Doyle, and William McCraner.

Murdock Township was organized in March 1873 and voting occurred in April 1873. The initial township leaders were: Trustee William Spencer, Treasurer W. Goodale, Clerk J. N. Shibles, Justices of the Peace Reuben Moore and B. F. Hess, and Constables B. E. Doyle and A. G. Davis.

Geography
According to the USGS, it contains two cemeteries: Shafer and Union.

The streams of Fourmile Creek, Prairie Creek, Whitewater Creek and Wildcat Creek run through this township.

Further reading

References

External links
 City-Data.com

Townships in Butler County, Kansas
Townships in Kansas